Henry Sidney Hamilton (28 January 1887 – 10 February 1976) was a Canadian politician. He represented the electoral district of Algoma West in the House of Commons of Canada from 1935 to 1940. He was a member of the Liberal Party. He was also a former member of the Canadian Expeditionary Force, attaining the rank Lieutenant-Colonel. He died at Plummer Memorial Hospital in Sault Ste. Marie in 1976.

References

External links 
 

1887 births
1976 deaths
Liberal Party of Canada MPs
Members of the House of Commons of Canada from Ontario